The Autopista Toluca–Naucalpan is a  toll road under construction in Greater Mexico City which will connect Toluca in the west with Naucalpan in the east, meeting the Autopista Chamapa–Lechería.

April 24, 2007, Constructora Teya (part of Grupo Higa) won the concession for 30 years, and so far the tollway has been under construction for almost ten years.

Ethnic conflict 
The construction of the highway has been stopped due to a legal battle the ñathö-Otomi community "San Francisco Xochicuautla" has undertaken against the "Constructora Teya". The highway crosses the "Bosque Otomi-Mexica" natural reserve, which is also sacred territory of the vernacular religion of the community.

References

External links

Highways in Greater Mexico City
Transportation in the State of Mexico